Freedomland is a 2006 American crime drama mystery film directed by Joe Roth and starring Samuel L. Jackson, Julianne Moore, Edie Falco, Ron Eldard, William Forsythe, Aunjanue Ellis, and Anthony Mackie. It is based on Richard Price's 1998 novel of the same name, which touches on themes of covert racism. The film grossed $14.7 million against a $30 million budget.  The Rotten Tomatoes critical consensus calls it "poorly directed and overacted".

Plot
Brenda walks through a predominantly African American housing project and enters an emergency room, apparently in shock and with cut and bleeding hands. Police detective Lorenzo Council is sent to take a statement from Brenda, who says that her car has been stolen. When Lorenzo gets there, she reveals that her young son, Cody, was in the back seat of the car. The police frantically begin searching for Cody.

Brenda's brother, Danny, a police officer in a neighboring town, calls a massive police presence in to search the housing project for clues. This angers the residents who protest their innocence. Lorenzo begins to suspect that Brenda is holding back details from him and pressures her to tell the truth. She insists that she has told the truth and would never harm her son. With a sketch artist she produces a picture of the man she says stole her car. Danny's white coworkers arrest a man from the housing project who they think matches the picture. Danny flies into a rage and beats him.

Desperate to find Cody, Lorenzo enlists the aid of a volunteer group which helps search for missing children. He suggests that they search Freedomland, an abandoned foundling hospital nearby. As they search, the group's leader Karen Collucci talks with Brenda.  Collucci had lost her own son years before and convinces Brenda to admit that Cody is dead. She leads them to a nearby park where they find Cody's body in a shallow grave, covered with heavy rocks.

Lorenzo realizes that Brenda could not have moved the rocks herself. Under interrogation Brenda admits to having been engaged in an affair with a man named Billy who lived in the projects. She would give Cody cough syrup so that he would fall asleep and she could visit Billy. On the night in question she had returned to find Cody dead, having drunk a whole bottle of cough syrup. Billy helped her bury his body. When the police go to arrest Billy, they are confronted by residents angry over previous unfounded police harassment and a riot erupts. Brenda is charged with criminal neglect, and Lorenzo promises to visit her in jail.

Cast

Production
Shooting took place mostly in Yonkers, New York.

Release

Home media
The film was released on DVD on May 30, 2006 with no special features. The film debuted on the Blu-ray format for the first time on November 6, 2012 by Mill Creek Entertainment. It was included in a double feature with the horror film The Messengers (2007).

Reception

Box Office
The film grossed $14.7 million against its $30 million budget.

Critical Reception
On Rotten Tomatoes the film has an approval rating of 23% based on 151 reviews. The consensus states: "Poorly directed and overacted, Freedomland attempts to address sensitive race and class issues but its overzealousness misses the mark." On Metacritic it has a score of 43% based on 35 reviews. Audiences surveyed by CinemaScore gave the film a grade C+ on scale of A to F.

Roger Ebert gave the film an overall negative review, and awarded the film 2 out of 4 stars, writing: "Freedomland" assembles the elements for a superior thriller, but were the instructions lost when the box was opened? It begins with a compelling story about a woman whose car is hijacked with her 4-year-old son inside. It adds racial tension, and the bulldog detective work of a veteran police detective. Then, it flies to pieces with unmotivated scenes, inexplicable dialogue, and sudden conclusions which may be correct but arrive from nowhere. The film seems edited none too wisely from a longer version that made more sense."

Sheri Linden of The Hollywood Reporter wrote: "The film is, above all, a moving portrait of hurting souls, brought to life in compelling performances."
Brian Lowry of Variety wrote: "Despite a few raw moments, pic feels like a Lifetime movie with a marquee cast."

In a more positive review, James Berardinelli awarded the film 3 out of 4 stars, writing: "The thing that makes Freedomland riveting is the way in which its tale of human tragedy unfolds. Although it begins by looking like a big screen episode of CSI, it develops into something more sublime and disturbing. This isn't a mystery in the conventional sense, but it's about secrets hidden and revealed, and the corrosive power of guilt. Even as Council probes into the dark recesses of Brenda's psyche, he seeks to exorcise his own demons. The two form an unlikely connection, the nature of which cannot be revealed without spoiling the ending. But don't expect any last-minute twists or turns. The movie doesn't employ sensationalist tactics to enhance its potency."

References

External links
 
 
 
 
 

2006 films
2006 crime thriller films
2006 crime drama films
American crime thriller films
American thriller drama films
2000s English-language films
Films based on American novels
Films based on crime novels
Films about children
Films about grieving
Films about missing people
Films about race and ethnicity
Revolution Studios films
Columbia Pictures films
Films with screenplays by Richard Price (writer)
Films scored by James Newton Howard
Films directed by Joe Roth
Films produced by Scott Rudin
2000s American films